Raine India Allen-Miller (born September 1989) is a British film and creative director. She is known for her feature directorial debut Rye Lane (2023).

Early life
Allen-Miller was born in Manchester with her mother and father and spent her early childhood in Moss Side. She has two younger sisters and one younger brother. With her father, she moved to Brixton, South London at the age of twelve where she attended the BRIT School in Croydon. She began her studies in Illustration at Camberwell College of Arts, but dropped out.

Career
Allen-Miller worked as an agent for artists and photographers, and then in art buying and creative production. Allen-Miller left her stable job to form a creative duo with school friend and copywriter Lisa Turner-Wray, submitting portfolios to agencies and landing their first advertising gig with Anomaly in October 2014. This was followed by further gigs with Saatchi & Saatchi and Mother.

Allen-Miller directed her first music video for Salute's "Storm" in the aftermath of the 2016 EU referendum and made it a celebration of immigration. This was followed by Denai Moore's "Trickle" in 2017 as well as Allen-Miller's first short film Jerk in 2018. Jerk was about an older man from the Windrush generation. Allen-Miller also worked on campaigns for ASOS, the Tate Modern, and Squarespace, and on a workshop for the Creative Circle Foundation. She was named a 2021 Screen International Star of Tomorrow.

Through Jerk, Allen-Miller met BBC Film producer Eva Yates, who later recommended her to direct Nathan Bryon and Tom Melia's screenplay, then under the working title Vibes & Stuff. Allen-Miller boarded the project and helped Bryon and Melia develop the script, which would become her feature directorial debut Rye Lane, a romantic comedy she calls "a love letter to South London". The film opened at the 2023 Sundance Film Festival to critical acclaim.

Artistry
Allen-Miller considers director Steve McQueen her "biggest hero". She pulled a reference from the Channel 4 sitcom Peep Show when framing wide shots close to actors' faces without breaking the fourth wall, which cinematographer Olan Collardy called the "Peep shot".

References

External links
 

Living people
1989 births
Advertising directors
Black British filmmakers
Creative directors
English women film directors
Film directors from London
Mass media people from Manchester
People educated at the BRIT School
People from Brixton
People from Moss Side